The Bemidji State Beavers women's ice hockey program represented the Bemidji State University during the 2015-16 NCAA Division I women's ice hockey season.

Offseason
August 17: Assistant Captain Ivana Bilic was named to the Canadian U22 National Team

2015–16 Beavers

Schedule

|-
!colspan=12 style=""| Regular Season

|-
!colspan=12 style=""| WCHA Tournament

Awards and honors
Ivana Bilic, WCHA Defensive Player of the Year 
Brittni Mowat, G, All-WCHA Second Team 
Ivana Bilic, D, All-WCHA Third Team 
Melissa Hunt, D, All-WCHA Rookie Team

References

Bemidji State
Bemidji State Beavers women's ice hockey seasons
Bemidji